Pavilhão Multiusos (also known as Multiusos de Guimarães) is an multi-purpose arena in Guimarães, Portugal which is primarily used for hosting fairs, exhibitions, congresses, concerts and sporting events since 2001. It has a total capacity for 7, 000 people (3,000 seats). 

It was selected by broadcaster RTP to host the final of the national selection for the Eurovision Song Contest 2018, the Festival da Canção, on 4 March 2018.

See also
 List of indoor arenas in Portugal

References

External links
 

Indoor arenas in Portugal
Sport in Guimarães
Buildings and structures in Guimarães
Basketball venues in Portugal
Volleyball venues in Portugal
Sports venues in Braga District
2001 establishments in Portugal
Sports venues completed in 2001